The Sharp PC-1251 was a small pocket computer that was also marketed as the Tandy or TRS-80 Pocket Computer PC-3.

It was created by Sharp Corporation in 1982.

Technical specifications

24 digit (5×7 pixel) LCD
Integrated speaker
Same connector for printer and tape drive as PC-1401
2 built-in batteries
4 KB RAM
576 kHz clock frequency
24 KB ROM

See also
Sharp pocket computer character sets

References

External links
Sharp PC-1251 pictures on MyCalcDB (database of 70s and 80s pocket calculators)

PC-1251
PC-1251